Pyranja is a female German rapper. She started rapping at the age of 16. Early supporters and precursors were the rap crews DSC and the Underdog Cru. After a yearlong stay in Boston she went back to Germany, more precisely to Berlin. She socialized in the scene very quickly and many contributions for other artists followed.

The label Def Jam Germany showed great interest in the upcoming rap artist and so she released her first EP, called "Im Kreis ", in 2001. She even entered the German charts without any promotion. When the production of her album  Wurzeln & Flügel was already finished and the date of release was set, Def Jam broke up because of the difficult market situation.

Later Wurzeln & Flügel was released by another label called Dackel Enterprise. The sales figures of this record also surpassed all expectations and steadied her good reputation as "best female German rapper".

In 2004 Pyranja and her colleagues Joe Rilla, Dra-Q, Jamie White and Sera Finale founded the rap crew Ostblokk. Since they had known each other for a long time and had already used the same studios, the collaboration was a logical conclusion.
The CD Einmal um Blokk was released and became very successful.

In 2004 Pyranja also released her CD Frauen & Technik by her own independent label Pyranja Records.
This record turned out to be the most multifaced in her career. It does not only convince by her familiar calm and profound songs but also reflects the rough side of Pyranja. Using the pseudonym Christiane Latte for her tracks Ab 18 and Blondes Gift she performed as sassy as many of her male colleagues.
The ironic dig at the male-dominated rap-branche was made with intent.

In 2006, the new single "Nie wieder" and the album Laut & Leise have been released.
Furthermore she performed for her home state, Mecklenburg-Vorpommern, at this year's Bundesvision Song Contest and made eighth place.

Discography

Albums 
 2003 - Wurzeln & Flügel ("Wings & Roots", Dackel Enterprise)
 2004 - Frauen & Technik ("Women & Technology", Pyranja Records)
 2004 - Einmal Um Blokk,  ("Once around the block" with Ostblokk, Ostblokk Plattenbau)
 2006 - Laut & Leise ("Loud & Quiet", Headrush)

Singles and EPs 
 2002 - "Swingerclub" (Phlatline Records)
 2002 - "Fremdkörper / Kennzeichen D Pt.2" ("Foreign object / License Plate D Pt 2", Def Jam Promo)
 2000 - "Im Kreis / Nachtflug" ("In a circle / Night flight", Def Jam Promo)
 2001 - "Im Kreis EP" (Def Jam Germany)
 2002 - "Reine Nervensache" ("All about strength of nerves", Def Jam Promo)
 2003 - "Egal Was Ihr Sagt" ("No matter what you say", Dackel Enterprise)
 2004 - "Zeilen Für Dich" ("Lines for you", Pyranja Records)
 2005 - "Samba" (with Ostbokk, Ostblokk Plattenbau)
 2005 - "Pyranja vs. Laudert & Fröhlich" (Pyranja Records)
 2006 - "Nie Wieder" ("Never again", Pyranja Records)

Other 
 1998 - Feature on the Underdog Cru album Maximum
 1998 - Track the EP "Großmogul Nordost"
 1998 - Demotape
 1999 - Track with Daniel Santiago for the Compilation Beastside
 1999 - Feature on the Joe Rilla tape album Tritt 2000 Ärsche ("Kick 2000 asses")
 1999 - Track with Daniel Santiago on the compilation Sallys Sounds
 2000 - Track on the soundtrack to Ants in the Pants
 2000 - Track on the DJ Derezon tape album BerlinXklusiv
 2000 - Track on the Deja Vue album Zwei Dumme ein Gedanke ("Two idiots one idea")
 2001 - Several tracks on compilations, among others: Rappublik Sampler, Berlin macht Schule, Juice Master Blaster, Ladys First, Splash Allstar Event Album, Def Jam Unstoppable
 2001 - "Nachtflug RMX" on the Roey Marquis album Momentaufnahmen ("Snapshots")
 2001 - "Special Broadcast" with Fiva Mc on the "Beatz aus der Bude Allstars" compilation
 2002 - Feature on the Roey Marquis tape Battle Of The Words
 2002 - Feature on Moqui Marbles' album
 2002 - Feature on album "Kopfhoehrer" by Fiva MC & DJ Radrum, Track "Kopf Hoch"
 2002 - Feature on Roey Marquis' album "Herzessenz" ("Essence of the heart")
 2003 - Several tracks on compilations, among others: Untergrund Experiment, Starting Line-Up XXL Dope Beats, Ghetto Fabulous
 2003 - Several features on the soundtrack to the hip hop themed feature film "Status Yo"
 2004 - Feature on Kimoe's EP "Ein neuer Morgen" ("A new morning")
 2004 - Feature on Jago's LP
 2004 - Feature on Yaneq & Freaky Floe's EP "Nachts Draußen" ("Outside at night")
 2004 - Feature on Moqui Marbles' LP
 2005 - Feature on "Back in the Tapez" by DraQ & Jamie White
 2006 - "Guess who's back", track on "Juice Exclusive" sampler #61

See also
 List of German hip hop musicians

External links 
Official website (with info; pictures, lyrics, downloads...)
Ostblokk website (with info, pictures, downloads, includes message board...)
Ostblokk Fanpage (info, large picture gallery, interview collection...)
 Pyranja: Portrait
 Interview

German rappers
German women rappers
1978 births
Living people
People from Rostock
Participants in the Bundesvision Song Contest